The FIS Nordic World Ski Championships 1962 took place February 18–25, 1962 in Zakopane, Poland. Zakopane became the second city to host the world championships three times (1929, 1939), joining Lahti, Finland (1926, 1938, and 1958). Women's 5 km and the ski jumping individual normal hill made their event debuts at these championships.

Men's cross-country

15 km 
February 20, 1962

30 km 
February 18, 1962

50 km 
February 24, 1962

4 × 10 km relay
February 22, 1962

Women's cross-country

5 km 
February 19, 1962

10 km 
February 21, 1962

3 × 5 km relay
February 23, 1962

Men's Nordic combined

Individual 
February 19/20, 1962

Men's ski jumping

Individual normal hill 
February 21, 1962

Individual large hill 
February 25, 1962

Medal table

References
FIS 1962 Cross-country results
FIS 1962 Nordic combined results
FIS 1962 Ski jumping results
Results from German Wikipedia

FIS Nordic World Ski Championships
1962 in Nordic combined
Nordic skiing
Sports competitions in Zakopane
1962 in Polish sport
February 1962 sports events in Europe
Nordic skiing competitions in Poland